Alma en pena (English language:Soul in Pain) is a 1928  Argentine film directed by Julio Irigoyen.

The film was one of Irigoyen's earliest silent films. The film is about tango dancing, one of the director's many works in this field.

External links
IMDB listing
El Síndrome de Alma en Pena

1928 films
1920s Spanish-language films
Argentine black-and-white films
1928 drama films
Tango films
Argentine silent films
Films directed by Julio Irigoyen
Argentine drama films
Silent drama films